Martín Peña is one of the 40 subbarrios of Santurce barrio, in the municipality of San Juan, Puerto Rico.

Demographics
In 2000, Martín Peña had a population of 415.

In 2010, Martín Peña had a population of 204 and a population density of 2,914.3 persons per square mile.

Places
The Sagrado Corazón terminal station of the Tren Urbano of San Juan Is located in the corner of Fernández Juncos Avenue and Haydee Rexach street in Martín Peña.

Gallery

See also
 
 List of communities in Puerto Rico

References

Santurce, San Juan, Puerto Rico
Municipality of San Juan